Jack Brooks may refer to:
Jack Brooks (cricketer) (born 1984), English cricketer
Jack Brooks (footballer) (1904–1973), English footballer
Jack Brooks (lyricist) (1912–1971), British-American lyricist
Jack Brooks (American politician) (1922–2012), American Representative present at the John F. Kennedy assassination.
Jack Brooks (Welsh politician) (1927–2016), Baron Brooks of Tremorfa
Jack Brooks: Monster Slayer, Canadian monster movie

See also
 Jack Brooks Federal Building, government office building in Beaumont, Texas, U.S.
 Jack Brooks Regional Airport, public airport in Port Arthur, Texas, U.S.
 John Brooks (disambiguation)
 Brooks (surname)